Vriesea michaelii is a plant species in the genus Vriesea. This species is an epiphyte native to Brazil but probably extinct in the wild.

References

michaelii
Flora of Brazil
Epiphytes
Plants described in 1982